Boubacar Idrissa Issoufou (born December 13, 1976) is a Nigerien football striker.

Career
He has played in 2001 for the Kansas Jayhawks, 2002 between 2004 for Newman Jets and from 2005 to 2008 for Hollywood Way (California State). His nickname is 'Denis American'.

International career
He was a member of the Niger national football team.

External links 

1976 births
Living people
Nigerien footballers
Niger international footballers
Association football forwards